Sørstraumen Bridge is a cantilever bridge that crosses the Sørstraumen in the inner part of the Kvænangen fjord. The bridge lies just west of the village of Sekkemo in Kvænangen Municipality in Troms og Finnmark county, Norway. The prestressed concrete bridge is part of the European route E6 highway.

See also
List of bridges in Norway
List of bridges in Norway by length
List of bridges by length

References

External links
A picture towards the bridge

Road bridges in Troms og Finnmark
European route E6 in Norway
Bridges completed in 1980
1980 establishments in Norway
Kvænangen